Adrianne Therese León (born March 15, 1987) is an American singer-songwriter and actress. She is the co-founder and lead vocalist of the rock band Caught Crimson. León began her career writing songs for the soap opera General Hospital and went on to have a role as the punk rock teen Brook Lynn Ashton, which earned her a Daytime Emmy nomination and a Soap Opera Digest Award. She left the show for the CBS soap opera The Young and the Restless, where she took over the role of Colleen Carlton.

Biography

Early life
Adrianne León was born in San Diego, California; she is of Ecuadorian and Puerto Rican descent and lived in Ecuador as a child.  After moving to the US, León began modeling and performing. After completing the seventh grade, she was homeschooled by her mother and then rapidly advanced through high school. She is a member of the ASCAP and AFTRA.

Career
León voiced over a Glamma Jammas commercial and was also in a public service announcement for Vons, a supermarket chain.

León was hired in 2002 to write songs alongside Rick Krizman for the soap opera General Hospital. In 2003, she performed two songs for the documentary Hollywood's Magical Island: Catalina: "Everlasting Dream" and "She Heals You". She formed Caught Crimson with the help of Murray Yates, lead vocalist of the Canadian rock band Forty Foot Echo. León later recruited former Artension bassist Kevin Chown, former Alien Ant Farm guitarist Terry Corso, and former Forty Foot Echo drummer Rob Kurzretier. She provided vocals for a Glamma Jammas commercial song titled "Don't Get Me Started", written and produced by Kendall Marsh. She also sang "Favor Me" and "Falling In", both written and produced by Jody Whitesides. On October 4, 2003, Adrianne León performed at the California Avocado Festival and on August 23, 2003, she played at the Aloha Festival, where she opened for Dishwalla. Both festivals were held in Carpinteria, California.

In May 2004, León was cast as the feisty and rebellious teen Brook Lynn Ashton in the soap opera General Hospital. She portrayed the character as a talented punk rock singer and songwriter who constantly fights against her mother Lois Cerullo's pressure to become a rock star. Léon was named "Outstanding Performer of the Week" of September 13, 2004 by Soap Opera Weekly for her performance. The role earned her a Soap Opera Digest Award for "Outstanding Female Newcomer" as well as a Daytime Emmy Award nomination for "Outstanding Younger Actress in a Drama Series" later in 2005.

She also guest-starred on the ABC prime-time sitcom Hot Properties as the young music VJ Courtney alongside Harry Hamlin, as his much younger fiancée. In early 2006, León took over the role of Colleen Carlton on The Young and the Restless.

She returned as her character Brook Lynn Ashton on General Hospital on May 21, 2010.

Filmography

Awards and nominations

References

External links

 

1987 births
21st-century American actresses
Living people
American child singers
Female models from California
American women singer-songwriters
American film actresses
American women rock singers
American rock songwriters
American soap opera actresses
American stage actresses
American television actresses
American actresses of Puerto Rican descent
Singer-songwriters from California
Actresses from San Diego
American musicians of Puerto Rican descent
American people of Italian descent
American people of Canadian descent
Guitarists from California
21st-century American women singers
21st-century American women guitarists
21st-century American guitarists
21st-century American singers